Courcelette is a commune in the Somme department in Hauts-de-France in northern France.

Geography

History
Courcelette was a major tactical objective in the Battle of Flers-Courcelette during the Somme Offensive of the First World War during which the village was razed. The village was assigned as the major objective of the Canadian Corps during that battle and they succeeded in capturing it.  Accordingly, the actions and sacrifices of the Canadians are commemorated at the Courcelette Memorial which is just south of the village beside the D929 roadway.

Population

See also
 Battle of Flers-Courcelette
 Communes of the Somme department

References

Communes of Somme (department)